Sde Nehemia (lit. Nehemia's Field) (Sde Nehemya) is a kibbutz in northern Israel. Located in the Upper Galilee, it falls under the jurisdiction of Upper Galilee Regional Council.

The Banias and Hasbani Rivers converge on the grounds of the kibbutz.

History

Sde Nehemia was founded on 19 December 1940 by immigrants from Austria,  the Netherlands and Czechoslovakia, on land bought from the Arab village of al-Dawwara. It was originally known as Kvutzat Huliot, but later renamed after Nehemia de Lieme, a Dutch banker and Zionist activist who served as head of the Jewish National Fund.

In the early days of the kibbutz, the pioneers lived in tents in the midst of malaria-infested swampland. One of them, Yehuda Abas, a physician, distributed anti-malarial pills free of charge to the local Arab population but discovered they were being cut into four and sold for large sums of money to Arabs from Syria and Lebanon. Abas's solution was to introduce injections.

Rafael Reiss from Sde Nehemia was one of seven parachutists sent into Nazi-occupied Europe in 1944. He was captured by the Nazis and executed on 20 November  1944.

In May, 1948, the kibbutz requested, "somewhat shamefacedly",  1,700 dunams of land from the newly  depopulated Palestinian village of Al-'Abisiyya.

Differential salaries were implemented in 2003, ending the kibbutz tradition of economic equality.

Economy
Located in the fertile Hula Valley between the Golan Heights and Lebanon, agriculture is a significant source of income. The kibbutz also owns a plastics factory, Huliot, a leading manufacturer of pipe systems and plastic products. Huliot specializes in flow products for water supply, drainage, sewage and greywater recycling which it sells on the local and global markets. The factory was established in 1947.

References

External links

Facebook page for former volunteers

Kibbutzim
Kibbutz Movement
Upper Galilee Regional Council
Populated places established in 1940
Populated places in Northern District (Israel)
1940 establishments in Mandatory Palestine
Austrian-Jewish culture in Israel
Czech-Jewish culture in Israel
Dutch-Jewish culture in Israel
Slovak-Jewish culture in Israel